The Daewoo Tico is a city car produced by the South Korean automaker Daewoo from 1991 to 2001.

Overview

The Daewoo Tico was based largely on the 1988 Kei car Suzuki Alto. The car was equipped with a three-cylinder  796 cc S-TEC engine -upgraded version for export markets of the "Kei" engine 547 cc (33.4 cu in) F5B engine-, and came with either a five-speed manual transmission or three-speed automatic transmission (only in Korea). The Tico was exported to European markets. It was highly popular in such countries as: Romania, Bulgaria, Macedonia, Czech Republic, Slovak Republic, Croatia, Slovenia, Hungary, Austria and Poland. It was also exported to Latin America where it also was named Daewoo Fino for some markets. It was especially popular in Peru, where it was one of the most popular car models used for taxi services.

Daewoo expanded at the beginning of 1995, but the Tico was never sold in any of these markets, although its successor, the Matiz, was launched there in 1998, and went on to be a sales success.

Over its years of production, the Tico underwent major modifications to its specifications, mostly to the engine. Originally equipped with a carburetor and producing , it was later upgraded to fuel injection, thus passing the Euro 2 pollution standard, whilst also giving an increase in power output. Some versions of the Tico in the Korean domestic market were powered by liquefied petroleum gas.

Daewoo produced the Tico at the old Oltcit factory in Romania.

In 1998, the Tico was replaced with a new car, the Daewoo Matiz. The Tico was sold alongside the Matiz until 2001.

References

Tico
City cars
Cars introduced in 1991
2000s cars